The High Sheriff of Mayo was the British Crown's judicial representative in County Mayo, Ireland from the 16th century until 1922, when the office was abolished in the new Free State and replaced by the office of Mayo County Sheriff. The sheriff had judicial, electoral, ceremonial and administrative functions and executed High Court Writs. In 1908, an Order in Council made the Lord-Lieutenant the Sovereign's prime representative in a county and reduced the High Sheriff's precedence. However, the sheriff retained his responsibilities for the preservation of law and order in the county. The usual procedure for appointing the sheriff from 1660 onwards was that three persons were nominated at the beginning of each year from the county and the Lord Lieutenant then appointed his choice as High Sheriff for the remainder of the year. Often the other nominees were appointed as under-sheriffs. Sometimes a sheriff did not fulfil his entire term through death or other event and another sheriff was then appointed for the remainder of the year. The dates given hereunder are the dates of appointment. All addresses are in County Mayo unless stated otherwise.

High Sheriffs of County Mayo
1583: John Brown (1st High Sheriff)
1587–1589: John Brown (killed Mar 1589)
1639: Sir Henry Bingham, 1st Baronet
1641: John Garvey
1655: Edward Ormsby of Tobervaddy Castle
1656: Sir Arthur Gore, 1st Baronet
1662: Hon Sir Lucas Dillon
1662: Sir George Bingham, 2nd Baronet
1670: Sir Arthur Gore, 1st Baronet
1678: Sir George Bingham, 2nd Baronet
1684: Sir Henry Bingham, 3rd Baronet
1690: George Browne
1694: Sir Henry Bingham, 3rd Baronet
1703: Egbert Miller of Milford
1708: Sir Arthur Shaen, 2nd Baronet
1711: Sir Arthur Gore, 2nd Baronet
1718: Francis Knox of Moyne Abbey
1721: Sir John Bingham, 5th Baronet
1723: James Gildea of Gallagh and Port Royal
1731: John Browne, 1st Earl of Altamont
1732–1733: Arthur Knox of Castle Rea
1735: Robert Miller of Milford
1737: John Bourke, 1st Baron Naas
1745: Thomas Lewin of Cloghans
1746: William Chambers of Kilboyne [40]
1747: Sir George Browne, 6th Baronet
1748:
1750: Crosdaile Miller of Milford
1755: Roger Palmer, later Sir Roger Palmer, 1st Baronet of Castlelacken
1756: Charles Bingham, 1st Earl of Lucan
1756: Crosdaile Miller
1758: James Knox of Moyne Abbey
1763: John Knox of Castlerea (son of Arthur, HS 1733)
1765: Arthur Saunders Gore, 2nd Earl of Arran of the Arran Islands
1766:
1776: Neale O'Donnell, later Sir Neale O'Donnell, 1st Baronet of Newport
1778: John Browne, 1st Baron Kilmaine
1779: John Denis Browne, 1st Marquess of Sligo
1781: Valentine Blake
1782: Charles Costello of Edmondstown
1783: John Ormsby of Gortnarabby
1784: George Jackson, the younger, of Prospect
1785: Charles Atkinson of Rehins
1786: Hon. Denis Browne of Claremorris
1787: Charles Dillon-Lee, 12th Viscount Dillon of Costello-Gallin
1788: John Browne, 1st Baron Kilmaine
1791: Sir John Edmond Browne, 1st Baronet
1796: Joseph Lambert of Brockhill
1798: Right Hon Denis Browne

19th century

20th century

References
40. The Gentleman's and London Magazine: Or Monthly Chronologer, 1741-1794

 
Mayo
History of County Mayo